Stella Muir (12 September 1900–3 June 1984), known as the English Mary Pickford was an early twentieth-century English film actress.

Life
Born Edith Alice May Muir on 12 September 1900, in Scarborough, Yorkshire, she worked as factory girl in a clothing manufacturers in the York Street area of Leeds.  Muir had a short film career working in silent movies, initially in crowd work.  She was credited in three films in 1919, a series of twelve shorts in 1920 and three more short films in 1922.

Muir died on 3 June 1984 in Marlow, Buckinghamshire.

Filmography
 The Heart of a Rose (1920) as  Rose Fairlie
 A Lass o' the Looms (1919)
 The Call of the Sea (1919)
 Film Pie No.s 1-12 (1920)
 The Old Actor’s Story (1922) as Nell
 The Magic Wand(1922)
 The Lights O’ London (1922)

References

External links

 

English silent film actresses
1900 births
1984 deaths
20th-century English women
20th-century English people
Actors from Scarborough, North Yorkshire
Actresses from Leeds